The Roman Catholic Diocese of Coria-Cáceres is a diocese located in the cities of Coria and Cáceres in the Ecclesiastical province of Mérida–Badajoz in Spain.

History

 1143: Established as Diocese of Coria
 April 9, 1957: Renamed as Diocese of Coria – Cáceres

Bishops of Coria

1500 to 1700

1700 to 1949

Bishops of Coria-Cáceres
Manuel Llopis Ivorra (2 Feb 1950 – 16 Mar 1977 Retired)
Jesús Domínguez Gómez (16 Mar 1977 – 26 Oct 1990 Died)
Ciriaco Benavente Mateos (17 Jan 1992 – 16 Oct 2006 Appointed, Bishop of Albacete)
Francisco Cerro Chaves (21 Jun 2007 – 27 Dec 2019 Appointed, Archbishop of Toledo)
Jesús Pulido Arriero, H.S.O.D. (7 Dec 2021 – )

See also
Roman Catholicism in Spain
Roman Catholic Archdiocese of Nueva Cáceres

References

Sources
 Catholic Hierarchy 

Roman Catholic dioceses in Spain
Religious organizations established in the 1140s
Roman Catholic dioceses established in the 12th century